The Tawau Bell Tower (also known as the Belfry) is the oldest standing structure in Tawau, constructed by the Japanese to commemorate the signing of armistice agreement following World War I when Japan was an ally of Great Britain.

History 
The bell tower was constructed in 1921 by Japanese community in North Borneo using prison labour and funds contributed by Japanese businessmen in Tawau. Its bell went missing in a sudden which become a mystery, and there is a legendary story on the missing bell:

As the abandoned structure recently was almost near collapse, it was restored with funds contributed by the Rotary Club of Tawau (RCT) in 2006.

Features 
A bench mark also presents in the tower, which shows the town's elevation above sea level, beside being the mark for starting point of the distance to every place. The East Direction lead its way to Dunlop Street, Kuhara Road, Sin On Road and Apas Road; South direction faces the Celebes Sea; West direction to Tg Batu Road; while North direction to North Road and Merotai Road.

References

External links 

Bell towers
Monuments and memorials in Sabah
Tawau
Towers in Malaysia
Towers completed in 1921